The Harbour Islets are a group of two adjacent small rocky islands, joined at low tide,  part of Tasmania’s Trefoil Island Group, lying close to Cape Grim, Tasmania's most north-westerly point, in Bass Strait, with a combined area of 3.13 ha, in south-eastern Australia.

Fauna
The islets form part of the Hunter Island Group Important Bird Area.  Recorded breeding seabird and shorebird species include little penguin, short-tailed shearwater, white-faced storm-petrel, Pacific gull, silver gull, sooty oystercatcher, pied oystercatcher and Caspian tern. The mudflats exposed at low tide form a roosting site for waders.

References

North West Tasmania
Important Bird Areas of Tasmania
Islands of Bass Strait